The coat of arms of Tunisia displays a Carthaginian galley (symbol of freedom) along with a lion holding a sword (symbol of order), and a weighing scale (symbol of justice). In the centre, just under the ship, is the national motto written in Arabic: Freedom (حرية) - Order (نظام) - Justice (عدالة). The central emblem of the national flag is seen above the shield. The background is gold in all sections.

Official description
The official description of the coat of arms of Tunisia is as follows:

A golden shield divided in point consisting of:

On the right, a black lion turned to the left and armed with a scimitar argent.

On the left, black scales.

The motto of the Republic is inscribed in black on a golden scroll:

Liberty - Order - Justice.

In chief, a ship with a hull bistre, sails argent and flags red sailing on a sea azure.

On top of the national emblem a white circle with a figure of a red star with five points encircled by a red crescent.

History 
The first coat of arms of independent Tunisia are the Beylical coat of arms in use from 1861 to June 21, 1956, the date of adoption by beylical decree of the coat of arms of the Kingdom of Tunisia since March 20 of the same year.

Although formally adopted in 1861, they were already in use well before that date. They appear in particular on the cover of the book written by Henry Dunant and published in 1858.

See also
 Flag of Tunisia
 Armorial of Africa

References

External links

National symbols of Tunisia
Tunisia
Tunisia
Tunisia
Tunisia
Tunisia
Tunisia